Chicken Shack is an American restaurant chain. The first branch was opened in Royal Oak, Michigan by John and Iola Sobeck in 1956. Today, the chain has 21 locations in the Metro Detroit area.

See also
 List of fast-food chicken restaurants

References

1956 establishments in Michigan
Restaurants established in 1956
Fast-food poultry restaurants
Chicken chains of the United States